Anchiale modesta is a medium-sized stick insect from Papua New Guinea.

References

External links
Phasmatodea.com: Anchiale modesta Redtenbacher, 1908

Phasmatodea
Insects described in 1908